Fagone is a surname. Notable people with the surname include:

 Jason Fagone, American journalist and author
 Orazio Fagone (born 1968), Italian sledge hockey player and short track speed skater 

Italian-language surnames